The Grumman F9F/F-9 Cougar is a carrier-based fighter aircraft for the United States Navy and United States Marine Corps. Based on Grumman's earlier F9F Panther, the Cougar replaced the Panther's straight wing with a more modern swept wing. Thrust was also increased with the installation of a newer, more powerful engine. The Navy considered the Cougar an updated version of the Panther, despite having a different official name, and thus Cougars started off from F9F-6.

Design and development

Early development

Rumors that the Soviet Union had produced a swept-wing fighter had circulated a year before the Mikoyan-Gurevich MiG-15 first appeared at air shows in 1949. Despite the level of activity taking place with swept-wing aircraft, the Navy was not initially focused on the development of such aircraft. This was largely because the Navy's focus at the time was defending the battle group against high speed, high altitude bombers with interceptors, as well as escorting medium-range carrier-based bombers in all weather conditions. Air-to-air combat was of less interest.  Nonetheless, the Navy appreciated the importance of getting a capable carrier-based swept-wing jet fighter. Grumman was awarded a contract for the development of a swept-wing fighter jet in 1951. The arrival of the MiG-15, which easily outclassed straight-wing fighters in the air war over North Korea, was a major factor.

Prototypes were quickly produced by modifying Panthers, and the first (XF9F-6) flew on 20 September 1951. The aircraft was still subsonic, but the critical Mach number was increased from 0.79 to 0.86 at sea level and to 0.895 at 35,000 ft (10,000 m), improving performance markedly over the Panther. Instead of using conventional ailerons for roll control, the F9F-6 uses spoilers  on the upper surfaces of the wing. Wing fences were soon added and the spoilers extended from the fences to the tips of the wing. The rudder pedals controlled the part of the rudder below the horizontal tail surface, while the upper portion of the rudder was controlled by a yaw damper. This allowed the Cougar to fly safely and easily without the upper portion of the tail.

F9F-6

Initial production (646 airframes) was the F9F-6, delivered from mid-1952 through July 1954. The F9F-6 first flew on September 20, 1951, seven months after Grumman signed a contract with the Navy for swept-wing fighter. The J42 was a licensed version of the Rolls-Royce Nene.

Armament was four 20 mm (.79 in) AN/M3 cannons in the nose and provisions for two  bombs or  drop tanks under the wings. Most were fitted with a UHF homing antenna under the nose, and some were fitted with probes for inflight refuelling. The F9F-6 used an Aero 5D-1 weapons sight with an APG-30A gun-ranging radar. The F9F-6 was later designated F-9F in 1962. Sixty were built as F9F-6P reconnaissance aircraft with cameras instead of the nose cannon.

After withdrawal from active service, many F9F-6s were used as unmanned drones for combat training, designated F9F-6D, or as drone controllers, designated F9F-6K. The F9F-6K and the F9F-6D were redesignated the QF-9F and DF-9F, respectively.

F9F-7
The F9F-7 referred to the next batch of Cougars that were given the Allison J33 also found in the F9F-4, instead of the Pratt & Whitney J48. A total of 168 were built, but the J33 proved both less powerful and less reliable than the J48. Almost all were retrofitted with the J48 engine, and were thus indistinguishable from F9F-6s. These were redesignated F-9H in 1962.

Flexible deck testing
The Navy used two modified F9F-7s to conduct experiments landing on British-inspired flexible decks which did not require the use of landing gear. The reasoning was that since an airplane's landing gear comprises some 33% of the total weight, a plane without landing gear would gain a greater range and would be able to carry more ordnance. The aircraft were fitted with a  false bottom under the center fuselage to help balance the plane during landings on the flex-deck made up of a lubricated rubberized fabric. The planes were launched using a ramp and a handling dolly which served as temporary landing gear. The two F9F-7 aircraft in the test were equipped with the powerful J48-P8 engine instead of the Allison J33 engine originally used with the F9F-7. While the landing tests yielded positive results and proved that landing was clearly possible, the project was terminated in 1955 as it would have been difficult to move the aircraft around the carrier deck once they landed. It also required a highly skilled pilot to perform the landings and would have made it impossible to divert to a land base if necessary.

F9F-8
Work on the F9F-8 began in April, 1953 with three goals: lower the airplane's stall speed, improve aircraft control at high angles of attack, and increase range. It featured an 8 in (20 cm) stretch in the fuselage and modified wings with a greater chord, an increased area (from ), and a dogtooth. The airframe changes improved low-speed and high angle of attack flying, and gave more room for fuel tanks. It also was now capable of breaking the sound barrier in a steep dive. All four ammunition boxes were mounted above the guns, in contrast to the split location of most previous F9Fs including the Panther. Visibility, which was already very good was improved with the F9F-8. 601 aircraft were delivered between April 1954 and March 1957. Late production F9F-8 aircraft were given the ability to carry four AIM-9 Sidewinder air-to-air missiles under the wings (the first Navy aircraft to deploy with the missiles). Most earlier aircraft were later modified to carry Sidewinders. A number were given also nuclear bombing equipment. The F9F-9 was redesignated F-9J in 1962. The F9F-8B aircraft were F9F-8s converted into single-seat attack fighters, later redesignated AF-9J. The Navy acquired 377 two-seat F9F-8T trainers between 1956 and 1960. They were used for advanced training, weapons training, and carrier training, and served until 1974. They were armed with twin 20 mm (.79 in) cannon and could carry a full bombs or missiles load. In the 1962 redesignation, these were later called TF-9J.

Aerial reconnaissance
A total of 110 F9F-8Ps (photo-reconnaissance) were produced with an extensively modified nose carrying cameras. They were withdrawn after 1960 to reserve squadrons. In 1962, remaining F9F-6P and F9F-8P aircraft were re-designated RF-9F and RF-9J respectively.

Modifications of F9F-8 to convert to F9F-8P:
 The modification to eliminate the guns and related equipment and incorporate the photographic equipment and automatic pilot and their controls and instruments has resulted in the following changes:
 Rearrangement of the left and right consoles and the main instrument panel to provide space for the controls associated with the additional equipment.
 Some minor changes of the fuselage structure and equipment installations to provide for the necessary ducting control for hot air from the engine compressor, which is used for defrosting the camera windows and heating the camera compartment.
 Removal of all armament, the Armament Control System, and the AN/APG-30 radar system, and installation of an additional armor plate bulkhead.

Flight characteristics and deployment
The F9F was known to be highly maneuverable and easy to fly. Corky Meyer, who flew both the F9F Cougar and North American FJ-3 Fury, noted that compared to the latter the Cougar had a higher dive speed limit (Mach 1.2 vs Mach 1), a higher maneuvering limit of 7.5-g (compared to 6-g), and greater endurance.

This required 2+30 takeoff, cruise, and landing endurance plus reserves. The F9F-6 could perform a three-hour CAP mission on internal fuel. The FJ-2 and -3 with external tanks had less than 1+30 mission time and the FJ-4 just met the mission requirement."

The F9F Cougar was also a capable multi-role aircraft, which may explain why it was deployed less often than dedicated fighters. In spite of engine problems that plagued the FJ-3, it was deployed for a longer period than the F9F Cougar. This was more likely attributable to the fact the F9F had an attack role that was being superseded by new jets such as A4D-1 Skyhawk, rather than any deficiency as a fighter.

"The reason the FJ-3 was deployed a little longer and a little more often (19 times vs 16) in fighter squadrons than the F9F-8 probably wasn't because it was the better fighter. More likely it was because it has a minimal capability as an attack aircraft, whereas the F9F-8 was good for that too, including nuclear weapon delivery. In effect the F9F-8 was a jet attack placeholder along with the F7U-3M, while the pipeline was being filled with the FJ-4Bs and A4Ds. As a result, the FJ-3 was the designated day fighter by default on most deployments."

Operational history

United States
The first F9F-6s were assigned to fleet squadron VF-32 at the end of 1952. It arrived too late to the Korean theater to participate in the air war.

F9F-8s were withdrawn from front-line service in 1958–59, replaced by F11F Tigers and F8U Crusaders. The Naval Reserves used them until the mid-1960s, but none of the single-seat versions were used in the Vietnam War.

The only version of the Cougar to see combat was the TF-9J trainer (known as F9F-8T until 1962) during the Vietnam War. Detachments of four Cougars served with US Marines Headquarters and Maintenance Squadron 11 (H&MS-11) at Da Nang and H&MS-13 at Chu Lai, where they were used for fast-Forward Air Control and the airborne command role, directing airstrikes against enemy positions in South Vietnam between 1966 and 1968.

The TF-9J two-seat trainer had a long service with the U.S. Navy. It served as the Navy's advanced flight trainer for more than two decades. The proposed Cougar modification (re-engined with a J52 engine) was rejected, and the Navy selected the TA-4F Skyhawk. The last Cougar was phased out when Training Squadron 4 (VT-4) re-equipped in February 1974. A F9F-8T, BuNo 14276, is displayed at the National Naval Aviation Museum at NAS Pensacola, Florida.

Transcontinental speed record
The US Navy used the F9F Cougar to set the transcontinental crossing record on April 1, 1954. Three pilots from fleet fighter squadron VF-21 completed the  flight in under four hours with LCDR F.X. Brady setting the quickest time of 3 hours, 45 minutes and 30 seconds. This was the first time the distance had been covered in under four hours. The three F9F-6 aircraft refueled over Kansas from a North American AJ Savage, using an experimental refueling probe mounted on the nose.

Blue Angels
The U.S. Navy's flight demonstration team, the Blue Angels flew four different variants of F9Fs from the F9F-2 Panther to the F9F-8. The Blue Angels replaced their six F9F-5 Panthers with six F9F-6s in 1953. This was short lived however and the Navy subsequently took them for fleet use without using the planes in an air show. The F9F-6s were then replaced with overhauled F9F-5s until 1954 when the Blue Angels switched to the F9F-8. The Blue Angels used the F9F-8 until 1957 they were replaced by the Grumman F11F-1 Tiger, although one two-seat F9F-8T was retained for press and VIP flights.

Argentina
The only foreign air arm to use the F9F Cougar was the Argentine Naval Aviation, who also used the F9F Panther as well. Two F9F-8T trainers were acquired in 1962, and served until 1971. The Cougar was the first jet to break the sound barrier in Argentina. One aircraft (serial 3-A-151) is on display at the Naval Aviation Museum (MUAN) at Bahía Blanca, while the other was sold to a customer in the United States and subsequently lost in an accident on 31 October 1991.

Variants

XF9F-6  Prototypes built from the F9F-5 Panther, featuring swept-wing design, three built.
F9F-6  Initial production version; redesignated F-9F in 1962, 646 built.
F9F-6P  Photo-reconnaissance versions; redesignated RF-9F in 1962, 60 built.
F9F-6PD  Drone director aircraft, converted from F9F-6Ps; redesignated DF-9F in 1962.
F9F-6D  Drone director aircraft, converted from F9F-6s; redesignated DF-9F in 1962.
F9F-6K  Unmanned drone for combat training, converted from F9F-6s; redesignated QF-9F in 1962.
F9F-6K2  An improved version of the F9F-6K target drone; redesignated QF-9G in 1962.
F9F-7  Built with the Allison J33 engine; most were converted to take J48s; redesignated F-9H in 1962, 168 built.
F9F-8  Longer center fuselage, strengthened canopy, redesigned wing, increased fuel capacity, and the ability to carry AIM-9 Sidewinder missiles; redesignated F-9J in 1962, 601 built.
YF9F-8B  Prototype for a single-seat attack-fighter aircraft converted from a F9F-8; later redesignated YAF-9J.
F9F-8B  F9F-8s converted into single-seat attack-fighters; later redesignated AF-9J.
F9F-8P  Photo-reconnaissance versions built from F9F-8s; later redesignated RF-9J, 110 built.
YF9F-8T  One F9F-8 aircraft converted into a prototype for the F9F-8T training aircraft; later redesignated YTF-9J.
F9F-8T  Two-seat trainers built from F9F-8s; redesignated TF-9J in 1962, 399 built.
NTF-9J  Two TF-9Js used for special test duties.
YF9F-9 Original designation of the YF11F-1 Tiger prototypes. First flight was on 30 July 1954; redesignated in April 1955.

Operators

 Argentine Navy – Argentine Naval Aviation

 United States Navy
 United States Marine Corps

Aircraft on display

Argentina
F9F-8T
 0516/3-A-151 (Argentine Navy) – Argentine Naval Aviation Museum (Museo de la Aviacion Naval - MUAN) at Bahía Blanca, Argentina.

United States
F9F-6
 126670 – in storage at the National Air and Space Museum, Paul E. Garber Preservation, Restoration, and Storage Facility, Suitland, Maryland.
 128109 – National Naval Aviation Museum at NAS Pensacola, Florida.
 127236 – New Iberia Veterans Memorial Building, New Iberia, Louisiana.
F9F-6P
 unknown – The Town of Tonawanda Veterans Memorial in the Town of Tonawanda, New York. The aircraft has been on display since 1959 and in 2009 was refurbished when the new Town of Tonawanda Veterans Memorial was created.
 127484 – Former Marine Corps aircraft has been a ground display for children to play on in Boysen Park in Anaheim, California, since about 1960. For safety reasons, in 1967 the aircraft was coated in gunite to cover sharp edges that had developed.
F9F-7
 130763 – Cradle of Aviation Museum in Garden City, New York.
F9F-8
 131063 – Texas Air Museum in Slaton, Texas.
 131230 – National Naval Aviation Museum, NAS Pensacola, Florida.
 131232 – Museum of Flight in Seattle, Washington.
 138876 – Pueblo Weisbrod Aircraft Museum in Pueblo, Colorado.
 141117 – Intrepid Sea-Air-Space Museum in New York, New York. It is on loan from the National Museum of Naval Aviation. It was built in Grumman's Bethpage factory in 1955 and retired from active service in 1965. It previously served as a gate guard for Naval Weapons Station Earle, and later was displayed at a playground in Wall Township, NJ.
 141121 – Pima Air & Space Museum, adjacent to Davis-Monthan AFB, in Tucson, Arizona.
 144275 – Evergreen Aviation & Space Museum in McMinnville, Oregon.  It is on loan from the National Museum of Naval Aviation and is painted to represent the narrator's aircraft for the U.S. Navy Blue Angels precision flight demonstration team.
F9F-8B
 144276 – Patuxent River Naval Air Museum in Lexington Park, Maryland.
F9F-8P
 141675 – Yanks Air Museum in Chino, California.
 141702 – USS Midway Museum in San Diego, California.
 141722 – Flying Leatherneck Aviation Museum, MCAS Miramar in San Diego, California.
 144388 – Estrella Warbird Museum in Paso Robles, California. 
 144426 – Pima Air & Space Museum, adjacent to Davis-Monthan AFB in Tucson, Arizona.
 144402 – Military Aviation Preservation Society, M.A.P.S. in Canton, Ohio.
F9F-8T
 142442 – The Town of Woodridge, New York.
 147276 – USS Lexington Museum in Corpus Christi, Texas.
 147283 – Air Zoo in Kalamazoo, Michigan.
 147385 –  at the Patriot's Point Naval and Maritime Museum in Mount Pleasant, South Carolina.
 147397 – Pima Air & Space Museum, adjacent to Davis-Monthan AFB in Tucson, Arizona.
 142985 – Hickory Aviation Museum, Hickory Regional Airport (KHKY) in Hickory, North Carolina.

Specifications (F9F-6/F-9F)

See also

Citations

Bibliography
 Angelucci, Enzo and Peter Bowers. The American Fighter. Sparkford, UK: Haynes, 1987. .
 
 Elward, Brad. Grumman F9F Panther/Cougar. North Branch, Minnesota: Specialty Press, 2010. .
 Kinzey, Bert. F9F Cougar in Detail & Scale. Fallbrook, California: Aero Publishers, Inc., 1983. .
 Mersky, Peter. "Flying Cougars and Other Unusual Aircraft in Vietnam". Aviation News magazine, Vol. 18, No. 7, 17–31 August 1989. pp. 320–322.
 Neubeck, Ken. F9F Cougar Walk Around. Carrollton, Texas: Squadron/Signal Publications, 2012. .
 Swanborough, Gordon and Peter M. Bowers. United States Navy Aircraft since 1911. Annapolis, Maryland: Naval Institute Press, 1990. .
 Winchester, Jim.  American Military Aircraft. New York, NY: Metro Books. pp. 186–187. .

Further reading

 

F-009 Cougar
Grumman F-09 Cougar
Single-engined jet aircraft
Low-wing aircraft
Carrier-based aircraft
Aircraft first flown in 1951
Cruciform tail aircraft